José María Cela Ranilla (born 17 December 1969) is a Spanish retired footballer who played as a forward, and current research fellow at Rovira i Virgili University.

Club career
Born in Zamora, Castile and León, Cela started his football career at Real Valladolid's youth team and was eventually noticed by Real Madrid who signed him for their reserve team. He made his La Liga debut with Sporting Gijón.

After two seasons in Gijón, he found himself jumping from club to club each season, including a spell in FC Barcelona's reserve team, until he eventually settled at Dutch side RKC Waalwijk where he ended his career in 1999 after two seasons.

Personal life
Once Cela retired from football, he completely disconnected himself from the industry and went on to work in the field of educational research at Catalan university Rovira i Virgili where he has participated in several projects of both national and international research.

References

External links

Living people
1969 births
People from Zamora, Spain
Sportspeople from the Province of Zamora
Spanish footballers
Footballers from Castile and León
Association football midfielders
La Liga players
Segunda División players
Segunda División B players
Tercera División players
Eredivisie players
Real Valladolid Promesas players
Real Madrid Castilla footballers
CD Numancia players
Sporting de Gijón players
FC Barcelona Atlètic players
UE Lleida players
RKC Waalwijk players
Spain youth international footballers
Spanish expatriate footballers
Expatriate footballers in the Netherlands